Cape Flats English (abbreviated CFE) or Coloured English is the variety of South African English spoken mostly in the Cape Flats area of Cape Town. Its speakers most often refer to it as "broken English", which probably reflects a perception that it is simply inadequately-learned English, but, according to Karen Malan, it is a distinct, legitimate dialect of English.

Cape Flats English is very close to the Broad (or "Extreme") variety of White South African English.  argues that the Respectable−Extreme (or "Cultivated−Broad") dichotomy can also be set up for CFE itself, with the former being used by the middle class (whose L1 tends to be CFE) and the latter being used by the working class (whose L1 tends to be the Cape Vernacular variety of Afrikaans).

Not all Cape Coloureds speak broken English as many speak it fluently to the degree of white South African English. Many develop accents because most television shows are American.

Grammar
 Double negatives occur in the context of a co-occurring indefinite, as in "I didn't catch nothing".
 Calques from Afrikaans may occur, such as "I took that towel and I made me closed" (standard English: (...) wrapped myself).

Phonetics and phonology

References

Bibliography

 
 
 

Cape Town culture
Dialects of English
South African English
Languages of South Africa
City colloquials